Starstruck, stylized as StarStruck, is a 2010 American teen musical drama television film starring Sterling Knight and Danielle Campbell that premiered as a Disney Channel Original Movie on February 14, 2010.

Plot
Kalamazoo, Michigan teenager Jessica Olson is annoyed by her older sister Sara's obsession with teen pop idol Christopher Wilde, and is unhappy to have her spring break used visiting her widowed grandmother in Hollywood, California. She is even more disgusted by Sara's plans to drag her along to stalk Christopher. Meanwhile, behind the scenes of celebrity, Christopher has earned a reputation as a "spoiled punk" who often scuffles with paparazzi. He is on the brink of landing a movie deal, despite the director's reluctance to give him the role due to his reputation and celebrity. In order to prove that he is serious about landing the role, Christopher agrees to remain out of the tabloids for a while.

Sara convinces Jessica to sneak out with her to crash the birthday party of Christopher's girlfriend, famous model Alexis Bender, where Christopher is scheduled to perform. Christopher sneaks in and out of the party to avoid being caught, and hits Jessica with the exit door while she searches for Sara in the crowd. He takes Jessica to a hospital to make sure she hasn't suffered a concussion, then brings her to his Beverly Hills mansion so that he can make an appearance for the film director before taking her home. Jessica allows Christopher to stay in her grandmother's garage for the night when he learns the paparazzi have followed him. The next day, Sara brings Jessica to Malibu in the hopes of finding Christopher there. Jessica recognizes a disguised Christopher on the beach and approaches him, but the two are forced to make a quick exit from the beach when the paparazzi arrive; once they get away, Christopher shows Jessica around Los Angeles.

While attempting to return to Malibu, they are again spotted by the paparazzi, but manage to elude them by driving off the main road, losing Jessica's grandmother's car in a mud pool quicksand in the process. While walking back to Malibu, they get into a heated argument after Jessica calls Christopher out on his superficiality. Eventually, Christopher confides that he enjoyed hanging out with Jessica because she appreciated him for who he was as a person rather than his fame. They eventually return to the beach, where they almost kiss until Christopher realizes he could be recognized and panics. He tells Jessica that they can never speak to each other again, and that no one can know what happened between them that day. Heartbroken and angry, Jessica returns home to Kalamazoo with her family. Alexis finds out about Jessica and breaks up with Christopher.

Christopher later finds out that paparazzi have documented his and Jessica's relationship, and is persuaded by his managers to lie and say she was just a fan. Meanwhile, as Jessica is flocked by paparazzi at her house in Kalamazoo, she watches him tell a talk show host that he has never met Jessica. Angry at the way the media has forced Christopher to suppress his real self, she confronts the paparazzi and reprimands them for their dehumanization and objectification of celebrities. Jessica then becomes notorious for supposedly "lying" about having met Christopher. Christopher's best friend, Stubby, encourages Christopher to make his own choices. Christopher then turns down the movie role and fires his parents as his managers.

Later, Sara takes Jessica to a school dance with her. Christopher makes an appearance at the dance and apologizes to Jessica on stage as well as singing a song he had written for her. When the paparazzi appear at the dance, he confesses that he was the one who lied, and admits his feelings for Jessica. She forgives him and the two agree to go out on a proper date.

Cast
 Sterling Knight as  Christopher Wilde
 Danielle Campbell as Jessica Olson
 Maggie Castle as Sara Olson
 Brandon Mychal Smith as Albert Joshua "Stubby" Stubbins
 Chelsea Staub as Alexis Bender
 Matt Winston as Alan Smith
 Toni Trucks as Libby Lam
 Abbie Cobb as AJ
 Beth Littleford as Barbara Olson
 Dan O'Connor as Dean Olson
 Alice Hirson as Grandma Olson
 Lauren Bowles as Sheri Wilde
 Ron Pearson as  Daniel Wilde
 Hugh Dane as Howard
 Sunkrish Bala as Dr. Sanjay Lad

Production
The film was shot in 2009 on location in Los Angeles, California.

Reception
The movie premiere generated 6.0 million viewers, the first to debut on a Sunday night, becoming the channel's most-watched February original movie premiere in Total Viewers, Kids 7-11 and Teenagers. Disney Channel's highest numbers ever in the time period among teens (2.3 million), and second-highest on record in Total Viewers (6.0 million) and Kids 7–11 (2.4 million), behind only the August 19, 2007 encore of High School Musical 2. There were 987,000 viewers when it premiered in the UK and Ireland on May 14, 2010.

Soundtrack

The soundtrack was released on February 9, 2010 by Walt Disney Records. The soundtrack peaked at number 23 on the U.S. Billboard 200. It debuted at #98 on Billboard 200 chart with the sales of 8,257 copies. For the week ending of March 6, 2010, the soundtrack faced a surplus in sales, selling 19,058 copies (up 131 percent), it rose from #98 to #23 on Billboard 200 chart. Sterling Knight, who portrays Christopher Wilde in the film, only sings the title track on the soundtrack with the rest of the songs being performed by then Varsity Fanclub member Drew Ryan Scott. Knight stated that the reason for this was because he had joined the film's cast late.

Track listing

Charts

References

External links
 
 

2010 in American television
2010 soundtrack albums
2010 television films
2010 films
2010s musical comedy films
2010 romantic comedy films
2010s romantic musical films
2010s teen comedy films
2010s teen romance films
American musical comedy films
American romantic comedy films
American romantic musical films
American teen comedy films
American teen musical films
American teen romance films
Disney Channel Original Movie films
Films about singers
Films set in Los Angeles
Films shot in Los Angeles
Television soundtracks
2010s English-language films
2010s American films